The 2021-22 Southern Conference men's basketball season started non-conference play on November 9, 2021, and began conference play on December 29, 2021. The regular season ended on February 27, 2022, setting up the 2022 Southern Conference men's basketball tournament from March 4th to March 7th.

Conference Schedule 
Each team is scheduled to play 18 conference games. Each team will play every team twice, once at home and once on the road.

Head Coaches

Coach Changes 
East Tennessee State hired Desmond Oliver to replace Jason Shay who left for Wake Forest to become an assistant.

UNC Greensboro hired Mike Jones to replace Wes Miller who left for Cincinnati to become head coach.

Western Carolina hired Justin Gray to replace Mark Prosser who left for Winthrop to become head coach.

Coaches 

Notes:

 Year at school includes 2021–22 season.
 Overall and SoCon records are from the time at current school and are through the end of the 2020–21 season.
 NCAA Tournament appearances are from the time at current school only.

Preseason Awards 
The Preseason Southern Conference men's basketball polls was released on October 26, 2021.

Preseason men's basketball polls 
First Place Votes in Parenthesis

Coaches Poll 

 Chattanooga (7) - 77
 Furman (2) - 71
 East Tennessee State - 59
 Mercer (1) - 58
 Wofford - 49
 UNC Greensboro - 45
 VMI - 32
 Samford - 24
 The Citadel - 23
 Western Carolina - 12

Media Poll 

 Chattanooga (18) - 254
 Furman (3) - 220
 Wofford (1) - 191
 Mercer (2) - 190
 East Tennessee State - 186
 UNC Greensboro (3) - 160
 VMI - 104
 The Citadel - 74
 Samford - 57
 Western Carolina - 49

Preseason Honors

Regular season 
Source:

Conference standings

Conference Matrix

Players of the Week

Players of the Month

Records against other conferences

Conference Tournament 
The 2022 Ingles SoCon Tournament will be held in Asheville, North Carolina at Harrah's Cherokee Center from March 4th to March 7th.

References